is a Japanese drama series premiered on Fuji TV in 2004. Takuya Kimura played the lead role.

Cast 
Takuya Kimura as Haru Satonaka
Yūko Takeuchi as Aki Murase
Kenji Sakaguchi as Yamato Hotta
Noriko Nakagoshi as Yuri Aizawa
Ryuta Sato as Makoto Shimamura
MEGUMI as Chika Ishikawa
Somegoro Ichikawa as Tomonori Ikegami
Saori Takizawa as Saeko Sonoda
Kōichi Satō as Yuichiro Hyodo
Saburō Tokitō as Kengo Anzai
Yuriko Ishida as Yoko

Basic plot 
The show revolves around a corporate ice hockey team, the Blue Scorpions.  The main character is Haru Satonaka (spelled Halu in the show), the captain of the team.  Other team members are Yamato Hotta (the goalie), Makoto Shimamura (the rookie) and Tomonori Ikegami.  In the first episode, we learn that Haru idolizes their coach, Anzai, who was a former hockey player.  When he dies from an illness by the end of the first episode, Haru puts it upon himself to take care of his coach's widow, Yoko, and their young son, Wataru.  The introduction of the team's new coach (Yuichiro Hyodo) does not go well, as Haru refuses to conform to the new methods, especially after Hyodo insults Ansai's way of coaching.  This sets up a very antagonistic relationship between the two men.
Aside from the hockey, another aspect of the show is the members' love life.
Haru treats his relationships as games, refusing to fall in love.  This is probably a result of his promise to Anzai to remain an "iceman", believing that a relationship, especially if children were born, would have a negative effect on his game.  He believes he's found the perfect solution by starting a relationship with Aki Murase, an office lady from his team's corporation.  Their "contracted" relationship is a game, as she is waiting for the return of her architect boyfriend in New York.  However, she hasn't heard from him in 2 years, and she knows the relationship is over.  Still, she goes every Sunday to a bridge to wait for him.

Yamato is in a conflicted relationship with Yuri Aizawa, a friend and fellow office lady of Aki.  She is a self-confessed gold-digger, vowing never to live the same difficult life as her poor single mother.  She believes that Yamato is from a rich family, as he was driving Tomo's car the night they met.  He tries to tell her the truth, but she thinks he's only joking.  He doesn't want to be in a relationship built on a lie.

Tomo is the playboy on the team.  After finding out that he was the product of an affair, he rebelled, constantly throwing away the money his rich father gives him on friends and women.  Usually staying with one night stands, he finds a possible partner in Chika Ishikawa, yet another
of Aki's friends and co-workers.

Theme songs 
"I Was Born to Love You" by Queen as opening theme.
Almost all of the songs in this drama were by Queen. "Bohemian Rhapsody", "We Will Rock You", "We Are the Champions", "Radio Ga Ga", "Too Much Love Will Kill You", "Let Me Live","Fat Bottom Girls" etc. were used in this drama.

Ratings 
In the tables below, the blue numbers represent the lowest ratings and the red numbers represent the highest ratings.

References

External links 
 
Pride at jdorama.com
Pride A Review
IMDb entry

2004 Japanese television series debuts
Japanese drama television series
Ice hockey television series
2004 Japanese television series endings
Television shows written by Shinji Nojima
Fuji TV dramas